The 2012 OFC Men's Olympic Qualifying Tournament was the qualifying tournament to the football competition at the 2012 Summer Olympics in London for the member nations of the Oceania Football Confederation (OFC). The tournament was played in New Zealand, after an OFC decision to strip Fiji of the rights to host the tournament was made in January 2012. It was announced on 7 February 2012 that Taupo would host the qualifiers, with the sole venue being Owen Delany Park.

New Zealand won the tournament and qualified for the Olympic Games.

Participating teams

Squads

Group stage
The teams' paths to the Olympics were revealed on 17 February 2012.

Group A

Group B

Knockout stage

Due to the delay in the final group matches, the knockout stage was postponed by one day from the original schedule.

Semi finals

Third place play-off

Final

Awards
A number of awards were announced at the conclusion of the tournament.

Goal scorers

7 goals
 Ian Paia

6 goals
 Esava Naqeleca

4 goals
 Jean Kaltack

3 goals
 Micah Lea'alafa
 Greg Draper
 Louis Fenton
 Sean Lovemore
 Silas Namatak

2 goals
 Archie Watkins
 Jone Salauneune
 Misaele Draunibaka
 Karol Kakate
 Ethan Gailbraith
 James Musa
 Robert Tasso
 Roddy Lenga

1 goal
 Samuela Drudru
 Zibraaz Sahib

1 goal (continued)
 Daniel Saric
 Jason Hicks
 Jamal Seeto
 Nigel Dabinyaba
 Vanya Malagian
 Chris Tafoa
 Himson Teleda
 Jerry Donga
 Johan Doiwale
 Ailoa Tualaulelei
 Shalom Luani
 Kensi Tangis
 Barry Mansale

Notes

See also
Football at the 2012 Summer Olympics
2012 OFC Women's Pre-Olympic Football Tournament

References

External links
 Official OFC website
 Official OFC competition schedule

OFC
Olympic Football Tournament, 2012
OFC
2012
Oly
March 2012 sports events in New Zealand